William O'Kane (1 July 1940 – 28 May 2014) was an Australian rules footballer who played with Fitzroy in the Victorian Football League (VFL).

Notes

External links 
		

1940 births
Australian rules footballers from Victoria (Australia)
Fitzroy Football Club players
Myrtleford Football Club players
2014 deaths